Lindsay Davenport and Jana Novotná defeated the defending champions Gigi Fernández and Natasha Zvereva in the final, 6–3, 6–4 to win the women's doubles tennis title at the 1997 US Open. It was the 17th doubles title and second major title for Davenport, and the 67th title and ninth major title for Novotná.

This was the first major in which sisters Venus and Serena Williams competed, losing in the first round.

Seeds

Qualifying

Draw

Finals

Top half

Section 1

Section 2

Bottom half

Section 3

Section 4

References
 Official Results Archive (WTA)
1997 US Open – Women's draws and results at the International Tennis Federation

Women's Doubles
US Open (tennis) by year – Women's doubles
1997 in women's tennis
1997 in American women's sports